Älandsbro is a locality situated in Härnösand Municipality, Västernorrland County, Sweden with 832 inhabitants in 2010.

References 

Populated places in Härnösand Municipality
Ångermanland